The 1977 ABN World Tennis Tournament was a men's tennis tournament played on indoor carpet courts at Rotterdam Ahoy in the Netherlands. The event was part of the 1977 World Championship Tennis circuit. It was the fifth edition of the tournament and was held from 21 March through 27 March 1977. First-seeded Dick Stockton won the singles title.

Finals

Singles

 Dick Stockton defeated  Ilie Năstase 2–6, 6–3, 6–3

Doubles
 Tom Okker /  Wojciech Fibak defeated  Vijay Amritraj /  Dick Stockton 6–4, 6–4

References

External links
 Official website 
 Official website 
 ATP tournament profile
 ITF tournament edition details

 
ABN World Tennis Tournament
1977 in Dutch tennis